Boro (बर'/बड़ो ), also called Bodo, is a Sino-Tibetan language spoken primarily by the Boro people of India, Nepal and Bangladesh. It is an official language of the Indian state of Assam, predominantly spoken in the Bodoland Territorial Region. It is also one of the twenty-two languages listed in the Eighth Schedule of the Constitution of India. Since 1975 the language has been written using the Devanagari script. It was formerly written using Latin and Eastern-Nagari scripts. Some scholars have suggested that the language used to have its own now lost script known as Deodhai.

History 
As result of socio-political awakenings and movements launched by different Boro organisations since 1913, the language was introduced in 1963 as a medium of instruction in the primary schools in Boro dominated areas. The Boro language serves as a medium of instruction up to the secondary level and it is an associated official language in the state of Assam. Boro language and literature have been offered as a post-graduate course at the University of Guwahati since 1996. There are a large number of Boro books on poetry, drama, short stories, novels, biography, travelogues, children's literature, and literary criticism. Though there exists different dialects, the Western Boro dialect Swnabari form used around Kokrajhar district has emerged as the standard.

Writing system and script movement 
It is reported that the Boro and the Dimasa languages used a script called Deodhai that is no longer attested. The Latin script was used first to write down the language, when a prayer book was published in 1843, and then extensively used by Endle beginning 1884 and in 1904, when the script was used to teach children. The first use of the Assamese/Bengali script occurred in 1915 (Boroni Fisa o Ayen) and the first magazine, Bibar (1924-1940) was tri-lingual in Boro, Assamese and Bengali, with Boro written in Assamese/Bengali script. In 1952, the Bodo Sahitya Sabha decided to use the Assamese script exclusively for the language.  In 1963 Boro was introduced in schools as a medium of instruction, in which Assamese script was used.   Into the 1960s the Boro language was predominantly written in Assamese/Bengali script, though the Christian community continued to use Latin for Boro.

Boro Script Movement
With the Assamese Language Movement in Assam peaking in the 1960s the Boro community felt threatened and decided to not use the Assamese script. After a series of proposals and expert committees the Bodo Sahitya Sabha reversed itself in 1970 and unanimously decided to adopt the Latin script for the language in its 11th annual conference. The BSS submitted this demand to the Assam Government in 1971, which was rejected on the grounds that the Latin script was of foreign origin.  This instigated a movement for the Latin script which became a part of the movement for a separate state, Udayachal, then led by the Plains Tribe Council of Assam (PTCA).  In this context, the Boro leaders were advised by the Prime Minister Indira Gandhi to choose any Indian script other than Latin. In defiance of the Assam Government the BSS, in April 1974, went ahead and published Bithorai, a Boro textbook, in Latin script and asked school teachers to follow it.

Retaliating against the unilateral decision, the Assam Government withheld grants to schools using the Latin script.  This triggered a phase of active movement that was joined by the All Bodo Students' Union (ABSU) and the PTCA.  This led to a critical situation in November 1974 when fifteen volunteers of the movement died in a police firing, and many others were injured.  Unable to resolve the issue, the Assam Government referred the matter to the Union Government.  In the discussion, the Union Government suggested Devanagari script as the solution to the problem, which the BSS accepted in the Memorandum of Understanding in April 1975, and adopted later year in the Annual Conference.  This ended the Boro Script Movement.

Final Acceptance of Devanagari script

The Devanagari script for Boro was an unexpected development and it was not immediately accepted by the wider Boro community.  The BSS failed to implement the use of the Devanagari script, and writers continued to use the Assamese/Bengali and Latin scripts.  In 1982, ABSU included the demand of the Latin script in Boro schools in its charter of Demands.  Following an expert committee report, constituted by BSS, the Bodoland Autonomous Council adopted a resolution to use Latin script in its territory, which the Assam Government too accepted.

Nevertheless, in the discussion with the Bodo Liberation Tigers, the Union Government demanded the implementation of the earlier agreement with the BSS on the use of the Devanagari script if the Boro language was to be included in the Eighth Schedule of the Indian Constitution.  Following this, the ABSU and the BSS surrendered and agreed to use the Devanagari script exclusively, and the matter was settled.

Dialects
Kiryu (2012) suggests that the language of the Meche people and the Boro of Bengal are western dialects whereas the dialects in Assam are the eastern dialects of Boro.  The western dialects differ in phonology and grammar but are mutually intelligible. The Kokrajhar variety of the eastern dialects has been promoted as standard, at least for the eastern dialects.

Phonology

The Boro language has a total of 30 phonemes: 6 vowels, 16 consonants, and 8 diphthongs—with a strong prevalence of the high back unrounded vowel /ɯ/.  The Boro language use tones to distinguish words. There are three different tones: high, medium and low. The difference between high and low tones is apparent and quite common.

Vowels
There are 6 vowels in Boro.

 All vowels occur at the beginning, in the middle and at the end of syllables.

Diphthongs

Consonants
Boro has 16 consonants.  

 The three voiceless aspirated stops, //, are unreleased in syllable final position. Their unaspirated voiced counterparts are released and cannot occur word final position.
 Sometimes, // are pronounced as // respectively.
 The consonants // can occur in all positions.
 The consonants // cannot appear at the end of indigenous Boro words but occur in loanwords.
 The consonants // cannot appear at the beginning of words.

Tones
Since Boro is a tonal language, changes in tone affect the meaning:

Grammar

Sentence structure
Sentences in Boro consist of either a "Subject + Verb" or a "Subject + Object + Verb".

Vocabulary

Numerals
Bodo has a decimal system and counts to 10 with unique words, after which the number words combine to add to the larger number as shown in the chart below.

Education
Boro is a compulsory subject till class 10 in tribal areas of Assam who do not want to study Assamese. The subject is mandatory in all schools including those under the Central Board of Secondary Education (CBSE) and Kendriya Vidyalaya Sangathan (KVS). The legislation was passed in the assembly in August 2017.

See also 
 Boro people
 Bodo Sahitya Sabha
 Kokborok language
 Languages of Asia
 List of Bodo-language films

Notes

References

 
 
 
 
Perumalsamy, P (2016) Bodo in 'Linguistic Survey of India: West Bengal Volume, Part-I' New Delhi: Office of the Registrar General India

External links 

 Boro language
 Bodo computing resources at TDIL
 Language Information Service – India
 Linguistic Survey of India West Bengal VolumeI 

Official languages of India
Sal languages
 
Languages of Assam
Languages officially written in Indic scripts
Sahitya Akademi recognised languages